Nuestra Belleza Sinaloa 2010,  was held in Canal 3, Culiacán, Sinaloa on August 13, 2010. At the conclusion of the final night of competition, Tiaré Oliva of Topolobampo was crowned the winner. Oliva  was crowned by outgoing Nuestra Belleza Sinaloa titleholder, Gabriela Quintero. Twelve contestants competed for the state title.

Results

Placements

Judges
Ana Laura Corral - National Cordinnator of Nuestra Belleza México
Emma Lucía Aragón - Nuestra Belleza Sinaloa 2004
Patricia Bojers - Contests Regional Coordinator of Nuestra Belleza México
Rosalva Luna - Nuestra Belleza México 2003

Contestants

References

External links
Official Website

Nuestra Belleza México
2010 in Mexico